The Rugby sevens competition at the 2017 Commonwealth Youth Games in Nassau, Bahamas was held in July 2017 at Queen Elizabeth Sporting Complex.

A total of 10 nations competed in this tournament. There were 6 teams in the boys event and 6 teams in the girls event. Each team played the other once in the group stage. The 5th and 6th placed teams played the 5th place playoff, the 3rd and 4th played the bronze-medal match and the 1st and 2nd placed teams played the gold-medal match. The girls competition was won by Australia, while the boys competition was won by Samoa.

Boys

Group stage

Final stages

5th Place Playoff

Bronze-medal match

Gold-medal match

Girls

Group stage

Final stages

5th Place Playoff

Bronze-medal match

Gold-medal match

Medal table

References

External links
Official website

2017 Commonwealth Youth Games events
Commonwealth Youth Games
2017 Commonwealth Youth Games
2017 rugby sevens competitions